James Edmund Dyer (September 20, 1946 – July 28, 2011) was an American politician from Connecticut.

Born in Danbury, Connecticut, Dyer graduated from Western Connecticut State University. Dyer served in the Connecticut House of Representatives and as mayor of Danbury from 1979 to 1987. Dyer defeated incumbent Mayor, Donald W. Boughton, in 1979. Dyer lost reelection in 1987.

Notes

|-

1946 births
2011 deaths
Mayors of places in Connecticut
Politicians from Danbury, Connecticut
Western Connecticut State University alumni
Members of the Connecticut House of Representatives